Banitsa (sometimes spelled Banica) may refer to:

Banitsa, a pastry from the Balkans
 Banovac, a Croatian coin used between 1235 and 1384.
one hundredth of an Independent State of Croatia kuna from 1941 to 1945

Places called Banitsa

Banitsa, Bulgaria, a village in Bulgaria
Banica, North Macedonia, a village in the Strumica Municipality, North Macedonia
Banica, Gmina Sękowa, a village in Lesser Poland Voivodeship, Poland
Banica, Gmina Uście Gorlickie, a village in Lesser Poland Voivodeship, Poland
Banița, a village in Săgeata Commune, Buzău County, Romania
Bănița (Hungarian: Banica), a commune in Hunedoara County, Romania
The Bănița River, a tributary of the Jiul de Est River in Romania
the former name of Vevi, a village in northwestern Greece
the former name of Symvoli, a village in northern Greece
Banitsa (ruins), the former village where Gotse Delchev was killed

See also
Banica (disambiguation)